The 1994–95 AHL season was the 59th season of the American Hockey League. The All-Star Game is revived, with All-Stars grouped into "Team Canada" and "Team USA." Sixteen teams played 80 games each in the schedule. The Albany River Rats finished first overall in the regular season, and won their first Calder Cup championship.

Team changes
 The Moncton Hawks cease operations.
 The Hamilton Canucks move to Syracuse, New York, becoming the Syracuse Crunch.
 The Springfield Indians move to Worcester, Massachusetts, becoming the Worcester Ice Cats.
 The Springfield Falcons join the AHL as an expansion team, based in Springfield, Massachusetts, playing in the North Division.

Final standings
Note: GP = Games played; W = Wins; L = Losses; T = Ties; GF = Goals for; GA = Goals against; Pts = Points;

Scoring leaders

Note: GP = Games played; G = Goals; A = Assists; Pts = Points; PIM = Penalty minutes

 complete list

Calder Cup playoffs

For the Semifinal, the team that earned the most points during the regular season out of the three remaining teams receives a bye directly to the Calder Cup Final. There is no set series format due to arena scheduling conflicts and travel considerations.

All Star Classic
The AHL revived the All-Star Classic, having last held the event during the 1959–60 season. The 8th AHL All-Star Game was played on January 17, 1995, at the Providence Civic Center in Providence, Rhode Island. Team Canada defeated Team USA 6-4.

Trophy and award winners

Team awards

Individual awards

Other awards

See also
List of AHL seasons

References
AHL official site
AHL Hall of Fame
HockeyDB

 
American Hockey League seasons
AHL
AHL